Zandro P. Limpot Jr. (born December 14, 1971), also known as Jun Limpot, is a Filipino former professional basketball player in the Philippine Basketball Association.

Playing career 

As a De La Salle Green Archer, Limpot led his team to two UAAP basketball titles (1989 and 1990). He shares the record of being a 3-time UAAP Most Valuable Player.

He then played for Magnolia Ice Cream in the PBL for four years from 1989 to 1993. He led the team to four conference championships and he won a PBL Most Valuable Player Award in the process.

Aside from that, he also was part of the national basketball team of the Philippines that won the Gold Medal at the 1991 Manila SEA Games. This then led Limpot to be the PBA's most sought-after amateur in the 1993 PBA Draft.

He was drafted 1st overall by the Sta. Lucia Realtors, where he averaged 20.6 points, 8.1 rebounds, 2.3 assists and 1.6 blocks in 39.8 minutes per game as a rookie. Limpot was the Rookie of the Year and spent 7 years with the Sta. Lucia franchise before being traded to the Barangay Ginebra Kings in 2000 for Marlou Aquino.

He was also a member of the national basketball team of the Philippines that participated at the 1998 Asian Games.

In 2004, he was traded to the Purefoods TJ Hotdogs where he won his only PBA championship in 2006. He then retired at the end of the 2006-07 season.

Personal life 
Limpot is married to Adrianne Escudero.

References 

1971 births
Living people
Asian Games bronze medalists for the Philippines
Asian Games medalists in basketball
Barangay Ginebra San Miguel players
Basketball players at the 1998 Asian Games
Basketball players from Surigao del Sur
Centers (basketball)
Magnolia Hotshots players
People from Surigao del Sur
Philippine Basketball Association All-Stars
Philippines men's national basketball team players
Filipino men's basketball players
Power forwards (basketball)
Southeast Asian Games gold medalists for the Philippines
Southeast Asian Games medalists in basketball
Sta. Lucia Realtors players
De La Salle Green Archers basketball players
Medalists at the 1998 Asian Games
Competitors at the 1991 Southeast Asian Games
Doping cases in basketball
Sta. Lucia Realtors draft picks